Ayodhya is a city located in Ayodhya District of Uttar Pradesh, India.

Ayodhya may refer to:
 Ayodhya (2005 film), a Tamil drama film
 Ayodhya (1975 film), an Indian Malayalam film
 Ayodhya (Ramayana), a legendary city mentioned in the ancient Sanskrit-language texts
 Ayodhya (opera), a 2006 opera by Somtow Sucharitkul 
 Ayodhya (Assembly constituency)